The Buddha Samyak Darshan Museum and Memorial Stupa is a  proposed museum and stupa to house a relic of the The Buddha which was discovered in an archeological excavation in Vaishali. The Bihar state cabinet approved its construction on 9 February 2013, and construction was commenced on 20 February 2019, inaugurated by Bihar chief minister Nitish Kumar. The museum will be built on 72 acres of land with a budget of 315 crore. The structure will be built of stone, with the Indian Institute of Technology Delhi providing technical support for its construction.

Geography

The museum and stupa is being built at Vaishali (ancient city), about 60 km from the Bihar state capital Patna.

Overview
The relic, found in Vaishali, was mentioned by the 7th-century Chinese Buddhist monk Xuanzang in his book. Anant Sadashiv Altekar discovered it in a casket in a mud stupa during an archeological excavation between 1958 and 1960. The casket containing holy relics of the Buddha to be kept at the proposed museum was given to the Lichchhavi king of Vaishali after the Buddha attained mahaparinirvana at Kushinagar. One eighth of the Buddha's mortal remains were given to the Lichchhavi king. It was later enshrined at the Buddha Relic Stupa in the fifth century. The relic casket containing the holy ashes of Gautama Buddha mixed with earth, a piece of conch, pieces of beads, a thin golden leaf and a copper punch marked coin, is kept at the Patna Museum.

Exhibition
According to the preliminary plan, the Buddha Samyak Darshan Sangrahalya is proposed to be developed on the line of the Global Vipassana Pagoda in Mumbai. It will have two components; a Buddha stupa and a Museum. There will be art and exhibition galleries with original artefacts, 3D models, multimedia presentation and an interpretation centre at the Museum. Animated short film will also be used to acquaint the visitors with the rich heritage of Buddhism. The stupa on the other hand will focus on Bihar and Buddha's Mahaparinirvana and major incidents of his life.

See also
 Global Vipassana Pagoda.
 Buddha Smriti Park.
 Mahabodhi temple.

References

Stupas in India
Urban public parks
2019 establishments in Bihar
Buddhist sites in Bihar
Buddhist buildings in India
Museums in Bihar
Vaishali district